Dickie Drake (born April 2, 1946) is an American politician who has served in the Alabama House of Representatives from the 45th district since 2011.

References

1946 births
Living people
Republican Party members of the Alabama House of Representatives
21st-century American politicians